The Malagonlong Bridge and  is a five-span  long stone arch bridge built during the Spanish colonial period in Tayabas, Quezon, Philippines. The bridge is known as one of the oldest bridges as well as the longest bridge made during the Spanish era. It was declared a National Cultural Treasure under the Historic Bridges of Tayabas on August 12, 2011.

Location 

The Malagonlong Bridge crosses the Dumacaa River and connects Barangay Mateuna and Lakawan to the eastern side of Tayabas as well as the municipalities of Mauban and Pagbilao.

Description 

It became a bridge for tourists rather than for vehicular traffic after a new bridge was built parallel to it. It is currently owned and managed by the local government unit of the municipality of Tayabas.

History 
The bridge was built between the years 1840 and 1850 under the direction of the Fray Antonio Mateos, a Franciscan priest who served as the Ministro del Pueblo of Tayabas. In an account of a Spanish traveler Juan Alvarez Guerra, the bridge was built in 1841 under Gobernadorcillo Don Joaquin Ortega's term. The bridge was made by the people of Tayabas through forced labor. It is estimated that 100, 000 adobe blocks was used to build the bridge.  An inscription on the bridge indicates that it was inaugurated in 1850 under the term of Gobernadorcillo Don Julian S. Francisco.

The bridge was declared by the National Historical Institute (now National Historical Commission of the Philippines) as a marked historical structure by placing a historical marker. In 2010, the local government of the municipality of Tayabas declared the eleven historical bridges of Tayabas, including Malagonlong Bridge, a historical bridge for protection purposes. The eleven bridges of Tayabas are:

See also
 Spanish colonial bridges in Tayabas

References

External links 

Bridges in the Philippines
Spanish colonial infrastructure in the Philippines
Buildings and structures in Tayabas
Bridges completed in 1850